The 1999 Pacific hurricane season was one of the least active Pacific hurricane seasons on record. The season officially began on May 15 in the Eastern Pacific, and on June 1 in the Central Pacific; in both basins, it ended on November 30. These dates conventionally delimit the period during which most tropical cyclones form in the northeastern Pacific Ocean. The first tropical cyclone of the season, Hurricane Adrian, developed on June 18, while the final storm of the season, Tropical Storm Irwin, dissipated on October 11. No storms developed in the Central Pacific during the season. However, two storms from the Eastern Pacific, Dora and Eugene, entered the basin, with the former entering as a hurricane.

The season produced fourteen tropical cyclones and nine named storms, which was well below the average of sixteen named storms per season; this was largely due to a strong La Niña taking over much of the Pacific. However, the total of six hurricanes and two major hurricanes during the season was near the averages of eight and three, respectively. Although it remained offshore, Hurricane Adrian caused 6 deaths from flooding and rough surf in Mexico. Hurricane Dora was a long-lived and intense cyclone, which had the second longest track of a Pacific hurricane on record. The storm brought minor impacts to the island of Hawaii; however, no deaths or damage was reported. The deadliest tropical cyclone, Hurricane Greg, killed 10 people from flooding in Mexico.

Seasonal summary 

The 1999 Pacific hurricane season officially started on May 15, 1999 in the eastern Pacific, and on June 1, 1999, in the central Pacific, and lasted until November 30, 1999. These dates conventionally delimit the period of each year when most tropical cyclones form in the northeastern Pacific Ocean. The 1999 Pacific hurricane season was well below average, due to the strong La Niña that was occurring at the time, which causes wind shear to be increased and water temperatures to decrease, resulting in conditions less conductive for tropical cyclones in the East Pacific. There were 14 cyclones in total, including 5 unnamed tropical depressions. Of these, 9 became a tropical storm, while 6 reached hurricane status. Further, 2 of these became major hurricanes, which is Category 3 intensity or higher on the Saffir-Simpson hurricane scale.

Tropical cyclogenesis began with Hurricane Adrian, which developed on June 18. Although it remained offshore, Adrian brought rough surf and flooding to Mexico, which resulted in 6 fatalities. The storm peaked as a Category 2 before dissipating on June 22. No other tropical cyclones formed in June. Activity halted until July 9, when Hurricane Beatriz developed. Though it peaked as a Category 3 hurricane before dissipating on July 17, the storm caused no damage on land because it remained well offshore. The next system, a short-lived Tropical Depression Three-E, did not result in impact as a tropical cyclone, though the precursor brought heavy rainfall and gusty winds to Central America. Tropical Depression Four-E, was the first of three cyclones to cross into the Central Pacific Hurricane Center's area of responsibility, which is between 140°W and the International Date Line. Two other short-lived system in July, Tropical Storm Calvin and Tropical Depression Six-E, caused no damage.

In August, Hurricane Dora, the strongest storm of the 1999 Pacific hurricane season, produced gusty winds and large waves on Johnston Atoll and the island of Hawaii, though minimal damage was left in its wake. After crossing the International Date Line on August 20, Dora became the first tropical cyclones to exist in all three basins of the North Pacific – Eastern, Central, and Western – since Hurricane John in 1994. Hurricane Eugene also existed in the Eastern and Central Pacific, but dissipated on August 15 while south of the main Hawaiian Islands, well before reaching the International Date Line. In the remainder of August, there was a series of short-lived tropical cyclones that did not effect land, including Tropical Depression Nine-E, Tropical Storm Fernanda, and Tropical Depression Eleven-E.

During the month of September, the deadliest tropical cyclone of the season, Hurricane Greg, was spawned near the Pacific coast of Mexico. Greg which killed 10 people when it made landfall on southern Baja California. The hurricane and its precursor produced heavy rainfall across much of Mexico, with the highest total reaching . The heavy rains damaged or destroyed more than 2,000 homes. The remnant moisture from the system, combined with an area of low pressure, resulted in strong thunderstorms across California, which led to numerous power outages, damage to homes and vehicles, and started many wildfires. The other in the month of September was Hurricane Hilary, a storm that approached Baja California, but dissipated offshore on September 21, resulting in no impact. The final system, Tropical Storm Irwin, produced scattered areas of heavy rainfall over Mexico in October, but caused no significant flooding. It dissipated on October 11, over a month and a half before the official end of the season on November 30.

In addition to the systems observed by the CPHC and NHC, a tropical depression formed east of the International Dateline on August 19, and quickly exited CPHC's area of responsibility; however, this storm was not included into CPHC database.

Systems

Hurricane Adrian 

Moving towards west-northwestward, the depression intensified into Tropical Storm Adrian about 12 hours later. Favorable levels of wind shear and warm sea surface temperatures (SST's) caused the storm to strengthen further.

After reaching peak intensity on June 21, Adrian began weakening due to colder SST's and higher wind shear. Adrian fell to tropical storm status late on June 21, and further weakened to a tropical depression on June 22. Heavy rainfall produced from the storm caused minor flooding throughout Mexico. Two fatalities were directly attributed to the floods, while another person was listed as missing. Four other people were killed when they drowned in rough seas produced offshore the Mexican coastline. There is no damage estimate from the heavy rainfall or rough seas associated with the hurricane.

Hurricane Beatriz 

At this time, the depression was in an environment of strong upper-tropospheric outflow, resulting in gradual intensification. The depression was upgraded to Tropical Storm Beatriz at 1200 UTC on July 9. Moving westward around the southern periphery of a ridge to the north, it continued to intensify. A well-defined eye became visible on satellite imagery early on July 12. Microwave imagery a few hours later revealed that Beatriz was likely undergoing an eyewall replacement cycle and was complete by 1700 UTC.

Further intensification occurred, and Beatriz became the first major hurricane of the season at 1800 UTC on July 12. Curving towards the west-northwest, Beatriz began to encounter an area of cooler sea surface temperatures, which led to gradual weakening. The hurricane weakened to a tropical storm at 0000 UTC on July 16, and further to a tropical depression by 1800 UTC that day. At 0600 UTC on July 17, Beatriz degenerated into a swirl of clouds.

Tropical Depression Three-E 

A tropical wave moved across the Atlantic and Caribbean in early July. While crossing Central America on July 11 and July 12, the system produced gusty winds and heavy rainfall, especially in Honduras, Nicaragua, and Mexico, where precipitation reached  in Coyutla, Veracruz. By July 13, the wave and associated low pressure area emerged into the Pacific Ocean. It initially headed west-northwestward until July 15, when it curved west-southwestward.

Tropical Depression Four-E 

On July 15, a tropical wave entered the eastern Pacific Ocean. Over the following days, slow organization occurred, and it is estimated that the system became developed into Tropical Depression Four-E at 0000 UTC on July 23. While moving westward, the depression entered the Central Pacific Hurricane Center's area of responsibility on July 24. By this time, however, the depression was already becoming disorganized and dissipated early on the following day.

Tropical Storm Calvin 

A tropical wave crossed the Atlantic Ocean and Caribbean Sea between early and mid-July. Later in the month, the wave acquired a low-level circulation. Due to further organization on satellite imagery, the depression was upgraded to Tropical Storm Calvin six hours later. However, wind shear exposed the low-level circulation and halted intensification. Calvin continued west-northwestward as a sheared cyclone.

According to satellite classifications, it is estimated that Calvin weakened back to a tropical depression at 0600 UTC on July 26. There was a convective burst late on July 26, though the storm did not re-strengthen. Around that time, Calvin turned northwestward in response to a mid-tropospheric trough. The burst in convection did not persist and the depression dissipated by 1200 UTC on July 27, while located well west-southwest of Baja California. A low-cloud swirl remained and subsequently continued on a west-northwesterly course for a few days.

Tropical Depression Six-E 

A tropical wave that previously crossed the Atlantic Ocean and Caribbean Sea reached the eastern Pacific basin until late July. The depression moved toward the west-northwest and encountered strong vertical wind-shear. Despite a few convective bursts, the depression remained weak and degenerated into a swirl of low clouds at 0000 UTC on July 28.

Hurricane Dora 

A tropical wave moved off Africa on July 23 and crossed the Atlantic Ocean without development. However, the wave quickly increased in organization after entering the Eastern Pacific Ocean on August 4, and was designated Tropical Depression Seven-E on August 6. The depression strengthened into Tropical Storm Dora later that day. Dora continued to intensify despite upper-level wind shear, and became a hurricane on August 8. Shortly after, the hurricane moved westward into a more favorable environment and began to intensify more quickly, reaching Category 4 strength on August 10. It maintained that intensity for three days as it moved almost due west.

Dora weakened to Category 1 strength as it entered the Central Pacific Hurricane Center's area of responsibility on August 14. However, it briefly restrengthened into a Category 3 as it passed south of Hawaii on August 16. Dora then began weakening for the final time as it passed south of Johnston Atoll on August 18. In Hawaii, heavy surf on the Big Island forced the closure of beaches, campsites, and hiking trails in the districts of Kau and Puna. On August 20, Dora crossed the International Date Line, shortly before weakening to a tropical storm. Due to vertical wind shear, it did not re-strengthen in the western Pacific basin. The storm weakened and fell to tropical depression intensity early on August 22. Dora dissipated late on the following day, while situated several hundred miles east of Wake Island.

Hurricane Eugene 

A tropical wave crossed Central America between July 28 and July 29, before entering the Pacific Ocean and slowly organizing. Twelve hours later, the depression was upgraded to Tropical Storm Eugene. It continued to deepen, reaching hurricane status late on August 8. The storm began to weaken and was downgraded to a Category 1 hurricane early on August 11.

Eugene continued westward, and on August 11, it entered the Central Pacific Hurricane Center's area of responsibility. It continued to weaken and was downgraded to a tropical storm early on August 13. Eugene passed south of the Hawaiian Islands on August 14, with minimal impact noted. Minor surf occurred along the east and southeast shores of the Big Island. Additionally, 24‑hour rainfall totals over windward sections of Maui and the Big Island were near . The storm weakened to a tropical depression by late on August 14.

Tropical Depression Nine-E 

A tropical wave moved off the African coast on July 27 and entered the Pacific Ocean on August 6. The system continued westward without development until August 11, when convection began to increase. By 1200 UTC on August 13, the National Hurricane Center began classifying the system as Tropical Depression Nine-E. Due easterly wind shear, the depression did not further intensify as it moved on a generally west-northwesterly track. The depression had dissipated by August 15.

Tropical Storm Fernanda 

The depression intensified gradually due to favorable conditions.

Around the time of peak intensity on August 19, Fernanda curved west-southwest track, a motion which persisted for the remainder of its duration. While this track carried the storm over warmer SST's, increasing easterly wind shear caused Fernanda to weaken. By early on August 21, Fernanda weakened to a tropical depression. After weakening slightly further, the storm degenerated into a remnant low cloud swirl at 0000 UTC on August 23.

Tropical Depression Eleven-E 

A tropical wave entered the eastern Pacific on August 15 and formed a surface low pressure area south of Mexico on August 19. After consolidating and organizing somewhat, the system became Tropical Depression Eleven-E late on August 23. However, colder SST's caused convection to diminish almost immediately, while moving parallel to the southern coast of Baja California. as thunderstorm activity slowly decreased due to cool SST's. By 1200 UTC on August 24, the depression dissipated just west of the tip of Baja California, having lasted for less than 24 hours.

Hurricane Greg 

The northern portion of a tropical wave in the Atlantic spawned Tropical Storm Emily, while the southern portion headed westward and crossed Central America between August 31 and September 1. Thereafter, the system emerged into the Pacific Ocean and began to organize. By 1200 UTC on September 5, Tropical Depression Twelve-E developed near Manzanillo, Mexico. Six hours later, the depression strengthened into Tropical Storm Greg. Further intensification occurred, and late on September 6, Greg was upgraded to a hurricane as winds reached . However, Greg weakened to a tropical storm on September 7, while approaching Baja California. At 2100 UTC that day, it made landfall near Cabo San Lucas. The storm then curved westward and weakened over colder SST's, until dissipating on late September 9.

Both Gerg and its predecessor disturbance brought heavy rain to much of Mexico. Precipitation from Greg caused flooding in the states of Colima, Michoacán, Sinaloa, Nayarit, and Jalisco. It was most severe along the Los Mezcales River. The flooding killed ten people. In addition, 2,000 people were rendered homeless and 2,000 others were affected in some way. The remnants of Greg produced thunderstorms in California, particularly the San Francisco Bay Area. As a result, there was widespread power outages and isolated damage to houses and vehicles, as well as causing several small wildfires. Overall damage was relatively limited, however.

Hurricane Hilary 

A tropical wave moved off the coast of western Africa into the Atlantic Ocean on August 29. It continued to move westward through the tropical waters of the Atlantic into the Caribbean. It still remained a tropical wave as it moved over Central America and began to acquire more convection and organization, from September 10 through September 11.

The system strengthened and was upgraded to Tropical Storm Hilary at 1200 UTC on September 18. However, later that day, Hilary weakened back to a tropical storm. The storm fell further to tropical depression status on September 21. Hours later, the storm degenerated into a swirl of low-level clouds, as it bypassed Baja California on September 21.

Tropical Storm Irwin 

The southern portion of the tropical wave that previously spawned Tropical Depression Eleven in the Gulf of Mexico entered the Pacific Ocean in early October. The depression initially moved slowly north-northwestward and strengthened into Tropical Storm Irwin about six hours later. After a strong mid-tropospheric ridge developed over northern Mexico, Irwin moved northwestward and remained offshore Mexico.

Stable air and increasing wind shear caused Irwin to weaken and fall to tropical depression intensity early on October 11.

Storm names 
The following names were used for named storms in the Pacific in 1999. This is the same list used in the 1993 season. No new names were used for the first time in the Pacific Basin. No storms were retired during the season, thus this same list was used again in the 2005 season.

For storms that form in the Central Pacific Hurricane Center's area of responsibility, encompassing the area between 140°W and the International Date Line, all names are used in a series of four rotating lists. The next four names that were slated for use in 1999 are shown below, however none of them were used.

Season effects 
This is a table of all the storms that formed in the 1999 Pacific hurricane season. It includes their duration, names, intensities, areas affected, damages, and death totals. Deaths in parentheses are additional and indirect (an example of an indirect death would be a traffic accident), but were still related to that storm. Damage and deaths include totals while the storm was extratropical, a wave, or a low, and all the damage figures are in 1999 USD.

See also 

 List of Pacific hurricanes
 Pacific hurricane season
 1999 Atlantic hurricane season
 1999 Pacific typhoon season
 1999 North Indian Ocean cyclone season
 South-West Indian Ocean cyclone seasons: 1998–99, 1999–00
 Australian region cyclone seasons: 1998–99, 1999–00
 South Pacific cyclone seasons: 1998–99, 1999–00

References

External links 

 NHC 1999 Pacific hurricane season archive
 HPC 1999 Tropical Cyclone Rainfall pages
 Central Pacific Hurricane Center archive

 
Pacific hurricane seasons
Articles which contain graphical timelines